Utsig Malsag Dolgiev (Ingush: Уцига Малсаг; Russian: Долгиев Малсаг Уцигович) (1825 –  1857) was a commander of the Russian Empire and close friend of Tsar Alexander II. Belonging to the Ingush teip Tumkhoy, he is considered as one of the biggest national heroes with many legends being dedicated to him.

Military rank 
Ranked as Stabs-Rittmeister, Dolgiev served in the His Majesty's Own Cossack Escort, a Russian Imperial Guard formation within the Imperial Russian Army.

Death 
In 1857, Utsig Malsag and his three companions were ambushed by a naib of Imam Shamil, the Chechen Saadula Ospanov. After hearing that Utsig Malsag was going to Chechnya, Shamil gave Saadula the mission to find Utsig Malsag and bring him either captured or his severed head. Saadula succeeded in fatally wounding Utsig Malsag in a duel but refused to decapitate the latter due to his death wish, that his body shall not be disfigured. Having triumphantly ambushed and defeated Dolgiev, Saadula took his shoulder straps as proof of victory and returned to Imam Shamil, who reacted angered of Saadula for not fulfilling his order of either bringing him alive or his head. The two got into a dispute which ended with Saadula leaving the ranks of Imam Shamil.

References 

 
Ingush people
North Caucasus
1825 births
1857 deaths
19th-century military personnel from the Russian Empire
Russian military leaders
Russian military personnel of the Caucasian War